Paradrillia felix is a species of sea snail, a marine gastropod mollusk in the family Horaiclavidae, the turrids.

Description
The length of the shell attains 10 mm.

Distribution
This marine species occurs off Japan.

References

 Kuroda, T.; Habe, T.; Oyama, K. (1971). The Sea Shells of Sagami Bay. Maruzen Co., Tokyo. xix, 1–741 (Japanese text), 1–489 (English text), 1–51 (Index), pls 1–121
 Higo, S., Callomon, P. & Goto, Y. (1999). Catalogue and bibliography of the marine shell-bearing Mollusca of Japan. Osaka. : Elle Scientific Publications. 749 pp

External links
  Tucker, J.K. 2004 Catalog of recent and fossil turrids (Mollusca: Gastropoda). Zootaxa 682:1–1295.
 Biolib.cz: image of a shell of Paradrillia felix

felix
Gastropods described in 1971